Sunanda K. Datta-Ray is an Indian journalist. He has been editor of The Statesman (Calcutta and New Delhi) and has also written for the International Herald Tribune and Time. He was editor-in-Residence at the East-West Center in Honolulu. He was editorial consultant to Singapore's The Straits Times newspaper. Datta-Ray also worked in Singapore in the mid-1970s with S. R. Nathan. After the Straits Times, Datta-Ray was a supernumerary fellow of Corpus Christi College, Oxford.

Datta-Ray returned to Singapore in 2007 to work on book with Lee Kuan Yew at the Institute of Southeast Asian Studies based on a series of one-on-one conversations and a host of classified documents. The book was published in 2009 as Looking East to Look West: Lee Kuan Yew's Mission India and won that year's Vodafone Crossword Book Award.

Personal history
Datta Ray was born 13 December 1937 in Calcutta, and educated at La Martiniere for Boys School, Calcutta. After graduating in English from the University of Calcutta, Datta-Ray trained as a chartered accountant in England.

In 1958 he was with the Stockport Advertiser, and in 1959 with the Northern Echo. In 1960 he joined The Statesman as junior London correspondent. In 1960–62 he was The Statesman'''s roving features editor, and 1962–68 the Sunday Magazine editor. In 1980–1986 he rose to be Deputy editor and became editor in 1986.

A Hindu – though his mother is of the Brahmo Samaj – Datta-Ray had a Catholic wedding in Australia to a Bengali woman whom he met in Sydney.

Datta-Ray sees himself as the product of the intermeshing of high-caste Bengali society and upper-class English society throughout the 18th and 19th centuries which, writes Datta-Ray, has now 'vanished'. Known as the Ingabanga, Datta-Ray defined his society thus:
It meant "England-worshipping Bengali" for Rabindranath Tagore. Krishna Dutta and W. Andrew Robinson translated it as "Anglomaniacs". It was always an outsider's description, never used by anglicised Bengalis themselves. Born in the heartland of that world, my grandmother spoke always of "the set".

Datta-Ray is a direct descendant of B.L.Gupta who was one of three Indians (the others were Surendranath Banerjea and Romesh Chunder Dutt) who in 1869, after tackling British ethnic nationalism, became the first Indian civilian in the Indian Civil Service. B.L. Gupta was educated at University College London. Datta-Ray's grandfather, K.P. Basu, went to Downing College, Cambridge and Basu's sister is the mother of India's former Chief of Army Staff Shankar Roychowdhury. Another ancestor is Jatin Sen Gupta and his wife the English woman Nellie Sengupta who was the first woman President of the Indian National Congress. Datta-Ray's father was a student at the London School of Economics.

Datta-Ray's is a member of the India International Centre and London's Travellers Club. He is also a member of the Bengal Club and the Calcutta Club. He resigned from the National Liberal Club (London).

Monographs
Datta-Ray has been published in Asia, Europe and the United States for over 40 years. He was asked to contribute to Penguin's book of 'new' Indian writing in 2005. In addition to this Datta-Ray has penned four monographs and edited one. His "Didima: The Last Ingabanga" appears in the Penguin anthology First Proof: The Penguin Book of New Writing from India, vol. I.

Datta-Ray's monograph Looking East to Look West: Lee Kuan Yew's Mission India (2009) charts aspects of Indian foreign policy with Singapore. Completely overlooked by academics, Singapore was also ignored by successive Indian prime ministers. Yet, Singapore is today the conduit for the bulk of foreign investment into India. Based on unique access to key decision makers including Lee Kuan Yew, Datta-Ray, for the first time, illuminates an essential aspect of Indian foreign relations on which hinges not only India's renewal but also the future of India's major foreign policy innovation since Non-Alignment—the 'Look East' policy.

He wrote the monograph Waiting For America about which the Doon School headmaster Kanti Bajpai wrote:
[A] huge book ... Datta-Ray is one of India's most respected journalists. An elegant writer with an eye for story-telling and a no–nonsense analytical pen, he traces the course of Indo-US ties from the time Indira Gandhi opened them in 1982. We in India lack contemporary history of the digestible, Datta-Ray kind. This book will sit well on our shelves. We would do well to ponder the implications of Datta-Ray's analysis: Indo-US ties will be stilted as long as Americans see Pakistan as a strategic asset; India's strongest asset is its economy, hobbled by its domestic politics.

Earlier Datta-Ray published Bihar Shows the Way, a caustic take on India and edited Issues and Challenges in Asian JournalismSmash And Grab: The Annexation of Sikkim'' (1984) is based on his personal friendships with the King of Sikkim and Indian decision makers. As the book described the process of the annexation of the Kingdom of Sikkim by the Indian government of Indira Gandhi in 1975, as "imperialism" it was banned in India.

Datta-Ray's views on 'The Rangzen Myth' have been challenged. The article claims "mysterious" changes in the reports on the Tibet at conferences.

References

Bengali writers
Indian male journalists
Indian newspaper editors
Living people
La Martiniere Calcutta alumni
University of Calcutta alumni
Fellows of Corpus Christi College, Oxford
1937 births
20th-century Indian journalists
Writers from Kolkata
Journalists from West Bengal